Harris Academy Tottenham  (HATO) is  a coeducational all-through school  located in Tottenham Hale in London. Part of the Harris Federation multi-academy trust, it opened to pupils in September 2014. The school had a favourable Ofsted inspection in May 2017.

Description
The school is part of the Harris Federation; it opened in September 2014 and initially operated from  Chobham Academy, another of the Harris Federation schools in Stratford, East London. The school relocated to its new site a year later, into pre-used buildings. The full conversion and an additional teaching block were completed for the 2017/18 academic year. The school’s site has undergone complete refurbishment; it shares its dance studio and sports fields with the public when not in school use.

Curriculum
The academy has designed its curriculum collectively calling heavily on Dylan William's education research.

Primary Education
The primary phase benefits from some specialist teaching from teachers from the secondary sector especially in year 6, where subject teaching is introduced.

Key Stage 3
Virtually all maintained schools and academies follow the National Curriculum, and are inspected by Ofsted on how well they succeed in delivering a 'broad and balanced curriculum'. Schools endeavour to get all students to achieve the English Baccalaureate(EBACC) qualificationthis must include core subjects, a modern or ancient foreign language, and either History or Geography.

Harris Academy Tottenham operates a three-year Key Stage 3 where all the core National Curriculum subjects are taught.

Key Stage 4
In Key Stage 4, all students do the EBacc core subjects (with Maths and Science at different levels judged by ability), and certain options: Classics, Performing Arts, Music, Art, Design Technology, Food Tech, Exam PE and Computer Science.

Key Stage 5
Entry to the sixth form is dependent on 7 GCSE passes, and the intention to achieve 3 or more 'A' levels.

Compliance
The academy publishes all the statutory information on its website .

Controversy
In September 2020, Lawrence Foley became Executive Principal of the Academy. He subsequently implemented a "zero-tolerance" approach to discipline, which saw three black students permanently excluded within the first month of his tenure. This triggered backlash from some in the school community.

A petition on change.org, which called for Foley's immediate resignation and accused him of  discriminating against black students, was raised by Joshua Adusei, a PE teacher. For his actions, Adusei was dismissed from his position. However, thanks to the power of social media, the petition gained widespread attention and amassed nearly 6,000 signatures within a week.

The petition claimed that the exclusion of the three students was racist, and the changes made by Foley to the discipline policy disproportionately affected students from Afro-Caribbean backgrounds. It was also alleged that he had been harassing members of staff through a school restructuring plan. Lawrence Foley, HATO's Senior Leadership Team, and the wider Harris Federation vehemently denied all allegations, with the Federation branding it a "misleading, vindictive, and vexatious campaign".

In the wake of the events, Foley received four death threats. Additionally, a threat was made, via the comments section of the petition, towards HATO staff, with the perpetrator, who is thought to be a student at the academy, threatening to "stab" them. All threats were reported to the police and the comments section below the petition was removed as a preventative measure. Adusei and supporters of his petition, however, believe this to be an infringement of their fundamental right to freedom of speech.

Opinion is largely divided over the scandal, with many accepting (or corroborating) the claims laid out in the petition and speaking of a deep-seated culture of institutional racism within academies and schools like HATO, which is proving detrimental to the growth and development of young black students. However, several others have dismissed the allegations as unsubstantiated and criticised Adusei for wrongfully subjecting the academy, and a teacher, to an infamous 'trial by social media'. They also highlight the potentially dangerous ramifications of such actions as evidenced by Foley receiving death threats.

See also
Pimlico Academy
Batley Grammar School

References

External links
 

Secondary schools in the London Borough of Haringey
Tottenham
Educational institutions established in 2014
2014 establishments in England
Primary schools in the London Borough of Haringey
Free schools in London